The Blue Angel, also known as "The Raz" is a nightclub in Liverpool, England. It is located where Seel Street meets Berry Street in Liverpool city centre. It is a venue in Liverpool in which The Beatles, Rolling Stones, Bob Dylan and many other bands played at in the 1960s. It was historically a jazz club, but it now plays pop music.

History

The building in which the club is situated was the birthplace in 1805 of Dr William Henry Duncan and a plaque above the door commemorates this. The Beatles' original manager Allan Williams was once the owner of the club and reputedly ejected Judy Garland after the local premiere of their first film A Hard Day's Night in 1964.

Pete Best's audition to join the Beatles took place in the Blue Angel on 12 August 1960. It was also where the Beatles, in 1960, auditioned for impresario Larry Parnes landing them their first tour outside Liverpool, supporting singer Johnny Gentle on a tour of Scotland.

After seeing Cilla Black performing "Bye Bye Blackbird" at the Blue Angel, Brian Epstein contracted Black as his only female client on 6 September 1963.

The Blue Angel today
The Blue Angel is especially popular with students, however the club attracts people from a wide range of ages and backgrounds, with people who attended the club in the 1990s still regularly visiting to this day. Monday nights are seen as one of the most popular nights for students to visit, and this coupled with the club holding an extended late night opening license means it is a draw with students.
The club has two main floors and an outside seating area. The lower floor has DJ equipment and a dance floor, whilst the upper floor has more seating and a more bar orientated feel. One popular drink available at the club is a 'Fat Frog' made by mixing a Smirnoff Ice, a blue WKD and an orange Bacardi Breezer.

In 2008, DJ equipment was seized from the club, following a series of complaints from local residents about noise levels, since the clientele had to smoke outside the club following the introduction of the smoking ban. The Blue Angel was banned from using its backyard.

A support network, set up mainly by students and boasting a website was created in order to "Save the Raz" from closure.

In 2010 the Blue Angel won the court battle to remain open and operate as normal.

References

Music venues in Liverpool
Nightclubs in Liverpool
1960 establishments in England